Paul Egloff (born 15 October 1959) is a Swiss ski jumper. He competed in the normal hill and large hill events at the 1980 Winter Olympics.

References

External links
 

1959 births
Living people
Swiss male ski jumpers
Olympic ski jumpers of Switzerland
Ski jumpers at the 1980 Winter Olympics
Place of birth missing (living people)